TLN (formerly Telelatino) is a Canadian English-language specialty channel owned by TLN Media Group. The channel primarily broadcasts lifestyle programming surrounding the Latin American and Italian cultures, including cooking and travel-related programs, as well as coverage of international soccer, and mainstream television series and films.

TLN previously broadcast in a trilingual format, carrying programming in the Italian, Spanish, and English languages (with the latter often focusing on off-network reruns of entertainment programs starring actors of Italian and Spanish heritage). This trilingual format was later phased out with the launch of sister digital cable channels dedicated solely to Italian- and Spanish-language programs.

History 

On October 23, 2007, TLN launched TLN en Español, a Category B Spanish language general entertainment channel. The channel would later be relaunched as Univision Canada in 2014.

In April 2018, the network introduced a new marketing campaign, Colour Your Life, to signal a shift in focus for the channel to include "all lovers of the mainstream cultural lifestyle" in addition to existing viewers, after having phased out its foreign-language programs in favour of more lifestyle programming relevant to Italian and Spanish culture.

Corus Entertainment previously owned a 50.5% majority share in the service; it later sold its interest to its existing partners and Di Felice for $19 million in 2019.

Programming
The network primarily airs programming related to Italian and Spanish cultures, including travel and cuisine.

TLN broadcasts a substantial amount of soccer programming, airing Serie A matches since 1984. TLN later secured the rights to air all Serie A matches between 2018 and 2021. and UEFA Champions League matches involving Italian and Spanish teams from 2002 to 2009. In 2009, TLN secured the rights to the UEFA Europa League to become the exclusive Canadian broadcaster of this tournament through to 2012.

In 2006, TLN partnered with CBC Sports to sub-license its rights to FIFA tournaments, including the 2010 and 2014 FIFA World Cup.

Controversy with RAI

From its inception up until mid-2003, TLN's Italian programming was derived primarily from RAI, Italy's state owned broadcaster, which made a commitment in 1984 to supply programming to Canada through TLN for as long as TLN was licensed in Canada. A dispute arose in 2003 when the head of RAI's international channel, decided to repudiate RAI's supply obligations as well as its 2001 agreement to launch a 24-hour RAI Canada channel, in favour of challenging Canada's regulatory regime by indicating that it wanted to deliver RAI programming through its own international channel on its own terms without restriction and not through TLN or through any Canadian programming partner.

In 2003, RAI pulled its content from TLN and petitioned the Canadian Radio-television and Telecommunications Commission (CRTC) to allow it to broadcast RAI International in Canada. This effort was backed by Rogers Communications, who sponsored RAI's application to get on the CRTC's approved list. After initially being rejected by the CRTC in 2004 in strong terms, RAI International was eventually approved by the CRTC in the spring of 2005 and began broadcasting in June 2005. After RAI International was launched in Canada, TLN began airing programming from Mediaset.

TLN Media Group
TLN is the flagship television network of the TLN Media Group, a consortium owned by three prominent Italian Canadian families and network president Aldo Di Felice, that is dedicated to multi-ethnic programming. In addition to TLN, the company also owns the following television assets:

 EuroWorld Sport – A sports network launched in July 2010 focusing mainly on association football and sports-related programming.
 Mediaset Italia (Canadian TV channel) – Launched in June 2010 and mainly broadcasts Italian programming from Mediaset Italia.
 TgCom24 (Canadian TV channel) – A Canadian version of the Italian Mediaset TGCOM 24 news channel. It was originally launched on June 15, 2005, as a simulcast of Sky Italia's Sky TG24 channel. It rebranded under its current name in December 2016.
 Telebimbi
 TeleNiños
 Univision Canada – A wholly owned Spanish-language entertainment channel, with the Univision name used under a brand licensing agreement with the U.S-based TelevisaUnivision USA.

References

External links
 
 CRTC Decision 1984-444 original TLN licence
 CRTC chart of TLN's assets (PDF)

Analog cable television networks in Canada
Italian-Canadian culture
Latin American Canadian culture
Multicultural and ethnic television in Canada
Television channels and stations established in 1984
Television broadcasting companies of Canada